2-Phenylpyridine is an organic compound with the formula C6H5C5H4N (or C11H9N). It is a colourless viscous liquid.  The compound and related derivatives have attracted interest as precursors to highly fluorescent metal complexes of possible value as organic light emitting diodes (OLEDs).

The compound is prepared by the reaction of phenyl lithium with pyridine:

C6H5Li + C5H5N → C6H5-C5H4N + LiH

The reaction of iridium trichloride with 2-phenylpyridine proceeds via cyclometallation to give the chloride-bridged complex:

4 C6H5-C5H4N + 2 IrCl3(H2O)3 → Ir2Cl2(C6H4-C5H4N)4 + 4 HCl

This complex can be converted to the pictured tris(cyclometallated) derivative tris(2-phenylpyridine)iridium.

References

Further reading

2-Pyridyl compounds
Photochemistry
Ligands
Phenyl compounds